Tanjong (Malaysian for "cape" or "headland"), alternatively spelled Tanjung, may refer to:
Tanjong, investment company of Malaysia
George Town, Penang (old name: Tanjong Penaga)
Tanjong Pagar, a district in Singapore
Constituencies in Malaysia:
Tanjong (federal constituency), represented in the Dewan Rakyat
Tanjong Barat (state constituency), formerly represented in the Penang State Legislative Assembly (1959–74)
Tanjong Selatan (state constituency), formerly represented in the Penang State Legislative Assembly (1959–74)
Tanjong Tengah (state constituency), formerly represented in the Penang State Legislative Assembly (1959–74)
Tanjong Utara (state constituency), formerly represented in the Penang State Legislative Assembly (1959–74)
Tanjong East (settlement constituency), formerly represented in the Penang Settlement Council (1955–59)
Tanjong West (settlement constituency), formerly represented in the Penang Settlement Council (1955–59)
Tanjong, another name for the Austronesian tilted square sail

See also
 
 
 Tanjung (disambiguation)